Claino con Osteno is a comune (municipality) in the Province of Como in the Italian region of Lombardy, located about  north of Milan and about  north of Como.  It is a small comune on Lake Lugano, composed of a series of small frazioni (hamlets): the biggest ones (Claino and Osteno) have been chosen for the municipal name.

Claino con Osteno borders the following municipalities: Alta Valle Intelvi, Laino, Ponna, Porlezza,   Valsolda.

Near Osteno is a site with numerous late-Jurassic fossils characterized by integral fossilization, including the Squaloraja polyspondyla.

References

Cities and towns in Lombardy